The Estonian Security Police and SD, or Sipo, was a security police force created by the Germans in 1942 that integrated both Germans and Estonians within a unique structure mirroring the German Sicherheitspolizei.

Following the German occupation in 1941, the German Army created police Prefekts based upon the old Estonian police model. In 1942 a new Sicherheitspolizei structure was installed. The new Sipo force was designed by Martin Sandberger, leader of Einsatzkommando 1a. It was a unique joint structure that consisted of a German component called "Group A" with departments A-I to A-V and an Estonian component called "Group B" with corresponding departments. The Estonian Sipo wore the same uniforms as their German counterparts, and attended Sipo schools in the Reich.

See also
 Occupation of Estonia by Nazi Germany
 Estonia in World War II
 Occupation of the Baltic states

References

Occupation of the Baltic states
The Holocaust in Estonia
Estonian collaborators with Nazi Germany
Generalbezirk Estland